The 1953 Colorado State Bears baseball team represented Colorado State College of Education in the 1953 NCAA baseball season. The Bears played their home games at Jackson Field. The team was coached by Pete Butler in his 11th year at Colorado State.

The Bears won the District VII playoff to advance to the College World Series, where they were defeated by the Duke Blue Devils.

Roster

Schedule 

! style="" | Regular Season
|- valign="top" 

|- align="center" bgcolor="#ccffcc"
| 1 || April 3 || at  || Unknown • Golden, Colorado || 10–4 || 1–0 || 1–0
|- align="center" bgcolor="#ccffcc"
| 2 || April 4 || at Coloardo Mines || Unknown • Golden, Colorado || 12–0 || 2–0 || 2–0
|- align="center" bgcolor="#ffcccc"
| 3 || April 10 || Lowry Air Force Base || Jackson Field • Greeley, Colorado || 3–14 || 2–1 || 2–0
|- align="center" bgcolor="#ffcccc"
| 4 || April 21 || at Warren Air Force Base || Unknown • Cheyenne, Wyoming || 0–6 || 2–2 || 2–0
|- align="center" bgcolor="#ccffcc"
| 5 || April 24 ||  || Jackson Field • Greeley, Colorado || 7–4 || 3–2 || 3–0
|- align="center" bgcolor="#ccffcc"
| 6 || April 25 || Colorado College || Jackson Field • Greeley, Colorado || 15–9 || 4–2 || 4–0
|- align="center" bgcolor="#ccffcc"
| 7 || April 28 || at  || Unknown • Denver, Colorado || 8–5 || 5–2 || 4–0
|-

|- align="center" bgcolor="#ccffcc"
| 8 || May 1 || Colorado Mines || Jackson Field • Greeley, Colorado || 9–1 || 6–2 || 5–0
|- align="center" bgcolor="#ccffcc"
| 9 || May 2 || at Colorado Mines || Unknown • Golden, Colorado || 8–1 || 7–2 || 6–0
|- align="center" bgcolor="#ccffcc"
| 10 || May 5 || at Warren Air Force Base || Unknown • Cheyenne, Wyoming || 13–11 || 8–2 || 6–0
|- align="center" bgcolor="#ccffcc"
| 11 || May 8 || at  || Unknown • Gunnison, Colorado || 15–1 || 9–2 || 7–0
|- align="center" bgcolor="#ffcccc"
| 12 || May 9 || at Western State || Unknown • Gunnison, Colorado || 7–10 || 9–3 || 7–1
|- align="center" bgcolor="#ccffcc"
| 13 || May 15 || at Colorado College || Stewart Field • Colorado Springs, Colorado || 6–5 || 10–3 || 8–1
|- align="center" bgcolor="#ccffcc"
| 14 || May 19 || at Fitzsimons Army Medical Center || Unknown • Aurora, Colorado || 19–3 || 11–3 || 8–1
|- align="center" bgcolor="#ccffcc"
| 15 || May 22 || Fitzsimons Army Medical Center || Jackson Field • Greeley, Colorado || 6–2 || 12–3 || 8–1
|- align="center" bgcolor="#ffcccc"
| 16 || May  || Warren Air Force Base || Jackson Field • Greeley, Colorado || 2–9 || 12–4 || 8–1
|-

|-
|-
! style="" | Postseason
|- valign="top"

|- align="center" bgcolor="#ffcccc"
| 17 || May  || at  || Derks Field • Salt Lake City, Utah || 3–6 || 12–5 || 8–1
|- align="center" bgcolor="#ccffcc"
| 18 || May  || at Utah || Derks Field • Salt Lake City, Utah || 8–5 || 13–5 || 8–1
|- align="center" bgcolor="#ccffcc"
| 19 || May  || at Utah || Derks Field • Salt Lake City, Utah || 4–0 || 14–5 || 8–1
|-

|- align="center" bgcolor="#ffcccc"
| 20 || June 11 || vs Lafayette || Omaha Municipal Stadium • Omaha, Nebraska || 2–6 || 14–6 || 8–1
|- align="center" bgcolor="#ffcccc"
| 21 || June 12 || vs Duke || Omaha Municipal Stadium • Omaha, Nebraska || 2–3 || 14–7 || 8–1
|-

References 

Northern Colorado Bears baseball seasons
Colorado State Bears baseball
College World Series seasons
Colorado State
Rocky Mountain Athletic Conference baseball champion seasons